Facundo Alfonso Andújar (born 4 July 1994) is an Argentine professional footballer who plays as a goalkeeper for Almirante Brown.

Career
Andújar's career began with Huracán's academy, prior to the goalkeeper securing a move to Estudiantes in 2014. He was on the first-team's radar for two years from 2015 but didn't make a competitive appearance for the Primera División team. On 9 August 2017, Andújar joined Deportivo Español of Primera B Metropolitana. His senior bow arrived on 7 April 2018 in a goalless draw in the league against Acassuso, which was the first of five matches he participated in during the 2017–18 season. In July 2019, Andújar signed with Almirante Brown.

Personal life
Andújar is the brother of Argentina international goalkeeper Mariano Andújar, who was also on the books of Estudiantes.

Career statistics
.

References

External links

1994 births
Living people
Footballers from Buenos Aires
Argentine footballers
Association football goalkeepers
Primera B Metropolitana players
Estudiantes de La Plata footballers
Deportivo Español footballers
Club Almirante Brown footballers